José Luis Chávez Sánchez (born 18 May 1984 in Santa Cruz de la Sierra) is a Bolivian football midfielder who currently plays for Bolivian club Royal Pari.

Club career
His former clubs include Bolívar, Destroyers and Universitario de Sucre in the Liga de Fútbol Profesional Boliviano and Atlas of the Liga MX.

International career
Chávez made his debut for Bolivia on August 6, 2008 during a friendly match against Guatemala and has earned a total of 25 caps for the national team, scoring one goal. He represented his country in 9 FIFA World Cup qualification matches and was included in the squad that participated in the 2011 Copa América.

Honours
Liga de Fútbol Profesional Boliviano: 5
 2005 A (Blooming), 2008 A (Universitario), 2009 C (Blooming), 2014 A, 2015 C (Bolívar)

References

External links
 
 
 
 
 
 José Luis Chávez profile Soccerpunter

1986 births
Living people
Sportspeople from Santa Cruz de la Sierra
Association football midfielders
Bolivian footballers
Bolivian expatriate footballers
Bolivia international footballers
Club Blooming players
Club Destroyers players
Universitario de Sucre footballers
Atlas F.C. footballers
Club Bolívar players
C.D. Jorge Wilstermann players
Bolivian expatriate sportspeople in Mexico
Expatriate footballers in Mexico
Liga MX players
2011 Copa América players